Lithuanian Research and Studies Center (LRSC) (Lith.: Lituanistikos tyrimo ir studijų centras (LTSC)) is a non-profit scholarly research organization, which brings together varying cultural and academic organizations towards acquiring and preserving Lithuanian artifacts, documents, and other materials of cultural significance. The LRSC was created in 1982 in Chicago, Illinois to unify a number of other Lithuanian organizations. It has two facilities. Its archival, periodical, audio-visual and musicology collections are in a 7,000 square foot self-owned facility at 15533 129th St. in Lemont. Its 75,000 volume library, Lithuanian Museum, Thomas Remeikis Political Science Library, Jonas Dainauskas History Library, Milda Budrys Medical Museum, military and art archives comprise another 7,000 square feet in the Lithuanian Youth Center (Lietuvių Jaunimo Centras, 5620 S. Claremont Ave.) in Chicago, Illinois. It is funded by donations primarily from the Lithuanian American community. The center is the largest Lithuanian scholarly institution, archive, and publisher outside Lithuania. It has published over 50 scholarly books in both Lithuanian and English. The current chairman of the LRSC is Robert A. Vitas. The current president is Kristina Lapienyte. The LRSC has become a notable organization in Lithuanian studies.

Leadership

Chairmen of the Board
Dr. Thomas Remeikis 1982–1988
Dr. Adolfas Damušis 1988–1998
Dr. Kazys Ambrozaitis 1998–2001
Dr. Vytautas Bieliauskas 2001–2010
Dr. Robert Vitas 2010–present

Presidents
Dr. John Račkauskas 1982–2009
Dr. Augustinas Idzelis 2009–2018
Kristina Lapienyte 2018–Present

Main website
 Lituanistikos tyrimo ir studijų centras - Lithuanian Research and Studies Center composed by Aušrys Matonis

Divisions

 The Lithuanian World Archives
 Zilevicius-Kreivenas Musicology Archives
 The Lithuanian Medical Museum and Archives
 The Budrys Foto Archives
 The Audio-Visual Media Division
 The Dainauskas Library and Archives
 The LRSC Fine Art Archives
 The Center for the Study of Genocide in Lithuania
 The Ramovenai Military Museum
 The Lithuanian Museum 
 The Thomas Remeikis Political Science Archive and Library

Affiliated organizations
Lithuanian Studies at University of Illinois at Chicago
Vilnius University
Vytautas Magnus University
Klaipėda University
Martynas Mažvydas National Library of Lithuania

References

Research institutes established in 1982
1982 establishments in Illinois
Non-profit organizations based in Chicago
Lithuanian-American culture in Chicago